Evolution 4.0 is Finnish power metal band Thunderstone's fourth album. It features the song "Forevermore" with which they participated in the pre-selections of the Eurovision contest.

Track listing
All songs written by Nino Laurenne, except where noted.
"Evolution 4.0"  – 0:13      
"Forevermore"  – 4:20      
"Roots of Anger"  – 3:43      
"10000 Ways"  – 4:16      
"Holding on to My Pain"  – 5:34      
"Swirled"  – 3:47      
"Down With Me"  – 7:16      
"Face in the Mirror"  – 3:03      
"Solid Ground" (Titus Hjelm) – 5:40      
"The Source"  – 4:48
"Great Man Down"  – 5:01
"The Riddle" (Nik Kershaw Cover) (Japanese Bonus Track) - 3:51
"Forevermore (Eurovision Edit)" (Limited Edition) - 3:00

Chart Finnish

Personnel
Pasi Rantanen - lead vocals
Nino Laurenne- guitar, backing vocal
Titus Hjelm - bass, backing vocal
Mirka "Leka" Rantanen - drums
Kari Tornack - keyboards

References

2007 albums